Naked Without You may refer to:

 "Naked Without You" (song), a 1999 song by Taylor Dayne
 Naked Without You (album), a 1998 album by Taylor Dayne